Piszczek is a Polish surname which is most frequent in the cities of Kraków and Nowy Targ in south central and Piła and Złotów in north west Poland and is also to be found among the Polish diaspora. It was first recorded in 1390 and is derived either from the Polish verb piszczeć with the meaning "squeak" or from the noun piszczałka for "pipe". Notable people with the name Piszczek include:
 Filip Piszczek (born 1995), Polish footballer
 Józef Piszczek (1912–1967), Polish agricultural scientist
 Łukasz Piszczek (born 1985), Polish footballer
 Renata Piszczek (born 1969), Polish climber

References

External links

Polish-language surnames